Seycove Secondary School is a Canadian high school in the Deep Cove neighbourhood of the District of North Vancouver, British Columbia. Located just east of Dollarton Highway, the school has a student population of approximately 500 students in grades 8 through 12. Seycove is part of the SD44 program called a family of schools (FOS). Seycove acts as the family school for the Elementary schools considered the feeder schools including Dorothy Lynas, Cove Cliff, and Sherwood Park.

Athletics

Seycove Secondary offers many sports ranging from golf to rugby. The teams include badminton, gymnastics, basketball, soccer, volleyball, mountain biking, swimming, cross country, skiing and snowboarding, rowing, golf, tennis, field hockey, track and field, and rugby.

The ski and snowboard team has won the district championship two years in a row. The gymnastics team has qualified for provincials almost every year. The cross country team has won the AA division banner recently for three consecutive years as well as having many athletes qualify for provincials. The rugby team has had two championship seasons back-to-back, winning the Tier Two “New Zealand Shield” and maintaining it the following year. As for the  soccer teams, the Senior Boys soccer team has won provincials and placed third during the 2009 provincials. The Senior Girls soccer team has also won provincials. Seycove's rowing team came in first place in the district many years in a row. The Senior boys and Junior boys basketball teams are both highly ranked within their leagues. The Senior girls basketball team also ranks highly, usually in the top 15, and they won the provincial championships in 2017.

Music
 
The school has several choirs and vocal groups. Its band program includes courses in concert band and jazz band. Concert Band offers students an opportunity to learn music fundamentals and improve their ability to perform in a large group setting. Jazz Band is an advanced enrichment course.

PLP
Seycove Secondary uses the Performance Learning Program, an academically rigorous mainstream magnet program for children in grades 8 to 12. Grade eight, nine and ten PLP students receive Humanities (English and Social Studies), Maker (ADST), Scimatics (Science and Math) and PGP (Personal Growth Planning) credits and grade eleven and twelve students receive English, History and PGP Credits. PGP and Scimatics courses are not guaranteed to be offered each year. The Performance Learning Program teaches students using project based learning.

Each PLP student is required to maintain a blog, referred to inside the program as a "learning portfolio". The blogs are published on blog44.ca, which is run by the North Vancouver School District.

Theatre

Seycove Secondary has a theatre program and its own black box theatre, nicknamed "The Vortex." The One Act Play Festival, which consists of one-act plays written and directed by students in the senior (grade 11 and 12) acting program, and the Spring Play, which is open to all members of the Drama department, take place in alternating years. Past productions include Tennessee Williams's The Glass Menagerie; Woody Allen's Play It Again, Sam; and William Shakespeare's Twelfth Night. For the 2008 spring season, the Senior Acting Troupe put on a production of Arthur Miller's The Crucible.

Other programs

The school offers several courses in visual arts, including Art Foundations, Portfolio, Photography, Film and Television, and Desktop Publishing. Other electives include Outdoor Education, Foods, Textiles, Drama, English Literature, Dynamics, Psychology, Law, History, and First Nations studies.

Transportation

The closest public transit routes are TransLink Buses #211, #212, #214, and #215 serviced one block west on Deep Cove Rd (NorthBound Deep Cove Rd@ Strathcona Rd).

References

External links
Seycove Secondary School
North Vancouver School District - Seycove Secondary School

High schools in British Columbia
North Vancouver (district municipality)
Educational institutions in Canada with year of establishment missing